A three-point field goal (also known as a "three-pointer" or "3-pointer") is a field goal in a basketball game, made from beyond the three-point line, a designated arc radiating from the basket. A successful attempt is worth three points, in contrast to the two points awarded for shots made inside the three-point line. The National Collegiate Athletic Association (NCAA) keeps records of the Division I 3-point field goal makes per game (3PG) average annual leaders. The statistic was first recognized in the 1986–87 season when 3-point field goals were officially instituted by the NCAA. The women's line would be moved back to match the men's line effective with the 2011–12 season. The women's line remained at 20 ft 9 in until being moved to the FIBA distance in 2021–22.

Darrin Fitzgerald of Butler owns the all-time NCAA single-season record of 3-pointers made per game (5.64) which he accomplished in 1986–87. His 158 three-pointers made that season is also the second highest total in history behind Stephen Curry's 162 in 2007–08. Some players—such as prolific scorers Darrell Floyd, Pete Maravich and Austin Carr—who competed prior to the 1986–87 season may have scored more baskets from what would have been 3-point territory if the rule had been in place during their college careers. Although Antoine Davis of Detroit Mercy is the career leader in 3-point shots made (588), he has never led the country on a per-game basis. The player with the highest 3PG average over the span of his entire career (with a minimum of 200 made threes) is Mississippi Valley State's Timothy Pollard, who made 4.57 per game over four years.

Key

3-point field goals per game

Footnotes

References
General

Specific

NCAA Division I men's basketball statistical leaders